Aktion Kinder des Holocaust (AKdH, "Action 'Children of the Holocaust'") is a Swiss voluntary association founded in 1991.
Its principal aim is the documentation of and opposition to antisemitism in Switzerland.
It is associated with the  University of Basel research projects "VIOLENCE youth" and "Right-wing youths in Switzerland".

Its modus operandi is to contact "insecure adolescents who might be turned from their extremist views" on web forums and chatrooms and to engage them personally, a practice they describe as "Internet Streetworking".
It also maintains extensive documentation of antisemitic statements made in Switzerland or on Swiss websites and puts 
pressure on Internet hosting service providers to terminate offending websites.
.

Among its activities, in 2002 it  criticized the work of Brazilian political cartoonist Carlos Latuff in 2002 for a cartoon depicting a Jewish boy in the Warsaw Ghetto saying "I am Palestinian". 
Also in 2002, it sued the Independent Media Center (IMC, also known as Indymedia) of Switzerland on the charge of antisemitism. The reason was a cartoon of Latuff's We are all Palestinians series, published in Swiss IMC website, which depicted a Jewish boy in the Warsaw Ghetto saying: "I am Palestinian." The criminal proceedings were suspended by Swiss court later in 2002.

Notable supporters listed as members of its patronage committee include
Israeli writer Uri Avnery,  Swiss writers Peter Bichsel and Mariella Mehr, former chief rabbi of Denmark Bent Melchior, Swiss anti-racist activist Sigi Feigel (d. 2004), and Holocaust survivor Simon Wiesenthal (d. 2005).

References

External links
Official website 

Anti-fascist organisations in Switzerland
Anti-racist organizations in Europe
Organizations established in 1991
1991 establishments in Switzerland
Opposition to antisemitism in Europe